"Yo No Sé Mañana" (English: I Don't Know Tomorrow) is a song performed by Nicaraguan salsa singer-songwriter Luis Enrique, released by Top Stop Music on March 23, 2009, as the first single from his 17th studio album Ciclos (2009). The song peaked at number six on the Top Latin Songs, his highest-peaking single since "Lo Que Es Vivir" in 1992, and was his first number one single on the Latin Tropical Airplay list since "Así Es La Vida" in 1994.

Awards and nominations
The song received a Latin Grammy Award for "Best Tropical Song" and a nomination for Song of the Year. The song was nominated at the 2010 Lo Nuestro Awards  for Tropical Song of the Year. The song was awarded a Billboard Latin Music award for "Tropical Airplay – Song of the Year".

Charts

See also
List of number-one Billboard Hot Tropical Songs of 2009

Covers

Christian Nodal

Certifications

Release history

References

2009 singles
Latin Grammy Award for Best Tropical Song
Luis Enrique (singer) songs
Songs written by Jorge Villamizar
Songs written by Jorge Luis Piloto
Record Report Top 100 number-one singles
Top Stop Music singles
2009 songs
Christian Nodal songs